Porokhino is a rural locality (a village) in Beketovskoye Rural Settlement, Vozhegodsky District, Vologda Oblast, Russia. The population was 13 as of 2002.

Geography 
Porokhino is located 56 km west of Vozhega (the district's administrative centre) by road. Tarasovskaya is the nearest rural locality.

References 

Rural localities in Vozhegodsky District